The 2020 Road to the Kentucky Oaks is a points system by which Thoroughbred fillies will qualify for the 2020 Kentucky Oaks, which will be held on September 4 (rescheduled from the traditional first Saturday in May due to the coronavirus pandemic). The field for the Kentucky Oaks, the filly equivalent of the Kentucky Derby, is limited to fourteen horses, with up to four "also eligible" horses in case of a late withdrawal from the field. 

Originally, the 30 races in the Road to the Kentucky Oaks were to be held from September 2019 (when the fillies are age two) through April 2020 (when they have turned three). However in March 2020, the growing coronavirus pandemic prompted the cancellation of several prep races, and the rescheduling of the Oaks itself. Churchill Downs is currently considering adding more qualifying races to the series with points to be determined. The top four finishers in the specified races earn points, with the highest point values awarded in the major preparatory races. Earnings in non-restricted stakes act as a tie breaker.

Fillies who instead wish to enter the Kentucky Derby have to earn the necessary points in the races on the Road to the Kentucky Derby: points earned on the Road to the Kentucky Oaks are not transferable. However if a filly does earn qualifying points for the Derby by racing in open company, those points also count towards qualifying for the Oaks.

Standings
The following table shows the points earned in the eligible races for the main series .

 Did not qualify/Not nomininated/Injured/Bypassing the race in gray

Race results
The dates for some upcoming races shown below are based on the placement in the racing calendar from 2018/2019. Similarly, the purses shown for upcoming races are based on the amounts from the previous year and will be updated when finalized.

Prep season

Championship series events

Extended series events
The following preliminary list of races have been announced for the extension of the Road to the Kentucky Oaks. These races have been added to the 2020 Road to the Kentucky Oaks as a result of the Oaks being run in September instead of May.

Dogwood Stakes (20-8-4-2)

1: Four Graces,
2: Edgeway,
3: Bayerness,
4: Lady Glamour

Acorn Stakes (G1, 50-20-10-5)

1:  Gamine,
2: Pleasant Orb,
3: Water White,
4: Lucrezia

Delaware Oaks (G3, 50-20-10-5)

1: Project Whiskey
2: Dream Marie
3: Princess Cadey
4: Piece of My Heart

Indiana Oaks (G3, 20-8-4-2)

1: Shedaresthedevil
2: Impeccable Style
3: Bayerness
4: Fire Coral

Beaumont Stakes (G3, 20-8-4-2)

1: Four Graces
2: Sconsin
3: Turtle Trax
4: Wicked Whisper

Ashland Stakes (G1, 100-40-20-10)

1: Speech
2: Venetian Harbor
3: Envoutante
4: Bonny South

Coaching Club American Oaks (G1, 100-40-20-10) Saratoga, July 18

1: Paris Lights
2: Crystal Ball
3: Antoinette
4: Tonalist's Shape

Monmouth Oaks (G3, 50-20-10-5) Monmouth Park, August 1

1: Hopeful Growth
2: Project Whiskey
3: Eve of War
4: Dream Marie

Audubon Oaks (10-4-2-1)

1: Mundaye Call
2: Ocean Breeze
3: Sconsin
4: Truth Hurts

Alabama Stakes (G1, 100-40-20-10) Saratoga, August 15

1: Swiss Skydiver
2: Bonny South
3: Harvey's Lil Goil
4: Envoutante

See also
2020 Road to the Kentucky Derby

Notes

Citations 

Road to the Kentucky Oaks
Road to the Kentucky Oaks
Road to the Kentucky Oaks
Road to the Kentucky Oaks, 2020